Kef may refer to:

Places
El Kef (also transliterated as Al-Kāf or Le Kef), a city in northwestern Tunisia
Kef Governorate, Tunisia

Others
Aram Bajakian's Kef, a 2011 album by guitarist Aram Bajakian
ISO 639:kef or Ewe language of southeastern Ghana
Kef Kalesi, a castle near Adilcevaz, Turkey
A letter in a fictional alphabet in John Norman's Gor novels
 Keflavík International Airport

See also
KEF (disambiguation)
Kief, a form of cannabis